Regina Graycar is an Australian lawyer and academic.  she is Emeritus Professor of the Law School of the University of Sydney.

Graycar was awarded a Bachelor of Laws degree from the University of Adelaide and a Master of Laws degree from Harvard University.

Graycar has been reported as being an expert in Family law.

Graycar is the co-author with Jenny Morgan of The Hidden Gender of Law

References

Living people
Australian women lawyers
Academic staff of the University of Sydney
Harvard Law School alumni
Adelaide Law School alumni
Year of birth missing (living people)
20th-century Australian lawyers
21st-century Australian lawyers